Tom Kristenbrun is a Canadian restaurateur, entrepreneur and former professional football player. In 1972, Kristenbrun purchased the historic El Mocambo in downtown Toronto with business partner Michael Baird. Over the years, Kristenbrun owned and operated many restaurants and venues in Toronto including Bistro 990. He played with the Toronto Argonauts in their 1963 season.

Holdings

References 

1940 births
Living people
Businesspeople from Toronto
Canadian restaurateurs